Lepyrodia is a plant genus in the family Restionaceae, described as a genus in 1810.

The entire genus is endemic to Australia, found in all 6 states and in the Northern Territory.

 Species

References

Restionaceae
Poales genera
Endemic flora of Australia